= Isola Peak =

Mountain in Alberta, Canada

Coordinates: 50.13339°N 114.48532°W

Isola Peak is a summit in Alberta, Canada.

Isola Peak was so named on account of its isolated location.
